Gérard Antoine Gaston Vignoble (29 October 1945 – 22 August 2022) was a French politician. A member of the Centre of Social Democrats, he served in the National Assembly from 1988 to 1997 and again from 2002 to 2007.

Vignoble died in Dinard, at the age of 76.

References

1945 births
2022 deaths
Technicians
20th-century French politicians
21st-century French politicians
Mayors of places in Hauts-de-France
Deputies of the 9th National Assembly of the French Fifth Republic
Deputies of the 10th National Assembly of the French Fifth Republic
Deputies of the 12th National Assembly of the French Fifth Republic
Socialist Party (France) politicians
Centre of Social Democrats politicians
Democratic Movement (France) politicians
Union for French Democracy politicians
The Centrists politicians
Chevaliers of the Légion d'honneur
People from Roubaix